Tizzard's Harbour is a local service district and designated place in the Canadian province of Newfoundland and Labrador.

Geography 
Tizzard's Harbour is in Newfoundland within Subdivision H of Division No. 8.

Demographics 

Government 
Tizzard's Harbour is a local service district (LSD) that is governed by a committee responsible for the provision of certain services to the community. The chair of the LSD committee is Rosemary Boyd.

See also 
List of designated places in Newfoundland and Labrador
List of local service districts in Newfoundland and Labrador
New World Island

References 

Populated coastal places in Canada
Designated places in Newfoundland and Labrador
Local service districts in Newfoundland and Labrador